The term "El Médico" means "The Doctor" in Spanish.  It may refer to:

 Reynier Casamayor Griñán, Cuban singer
 El Médico – the Cubaton Story, a 2011 documentary about Reynier Casamayor Griñán directed by Daniel Fridell
 The 1780 painting El médico by Francisco de Goya

See also
Doctor (disambiguation)
El médico de su honra
El médico módico